Smith Reservoir is located in Costilla County, Colorado, south of Blanca in the San Luis Valley. The reservoir is owned by the Trinchera Irrigation Company.

Dam
The rockfill dam, Smith Dam, was built in 1914 and — according to the National Inventory of Dams — stores  of water. It impounds Trinchera Creek. Sangre de Cristo Creek and several smaller creeks also flow into the reservoir; prior to the reservoir's construction, Sangre de Cristo Creek had its confluence with Trinchera Creek here.

State wildlife area
The lake and the land immediately surrounding it are also designated as the Smith Reservoir State Wildlife Area. It offers trout fishing, waterfowl hunting, and camping.

References

External links
Smith Reservoir State Wildlife Area (includes map)

Reservoirs in Colorado
Lakes of Costilla County, Colorado
Protected areas of Costilla County, Colorado
Wildlife management areas of Colorado